Below is a list of airports in France, grouped by department and sorted by commune.

France is a country with its main territory in Western Europe, with several overseas territories and islands. The area known as Metropolitan France extends from the Mediterranean Sea to the English Channel and the North Sea, and from the Rhine to the Atlantic Ocean.

France is divided into 18 administrative regions, of which 13 are in metropolitan France (12 on the continent, plus Corsica) and 5 are overseas. The regions divided into 101 numbered departments which are in turn subdivided into 342 arrondissements (districts), 4,032 cantons, and 36,781 communes (municipalities).



Airports in metropolitan France 

Locations shown in bold are as per the airport's AIP page. Most airports give two locations: the first is the city served, second is the city where the airport is located.

ICAO location identifiers are linked to each airport's Aeronautical Information Publication (AIP), where available, from Service d'information aéronautique (SIA), the French Aeronautical Information Service.

Airport names shown in bold indicate the airport has scheduled service on commercial airlines.

Links shown after airport name are intended to be moved as each airport's Wikipedia article is created: WEB indicates a link to the airport's website, UAF indicates a link to airport's page at L'Union des Aéroports Français.

Airports in French territories 
 List of airports in French Guiana
 List of airports in French Polynesia
 List of airports in Guadeloupe
 List of airports in Martinique
 List of airports in Mayotte
 List of airports in New Caledonia
 List of airports in Réunion
 List of airports in Saint Barthélemy
 List of airports in Saint Martin
 List of airports in Saint Pierre and Miquelon
 List of airports in Wallis and Futuna

See also 
 List of the busiest airports in France
 List of French Air Force bases
 List of airports by ICAO code: L#LF – France
 Wikipedia:WikiProject Aviation/Airline destination lists: Europe#France

References 
Civil aviation
 Aeronautical Information Service / Service d'information aéronautique (SIA) 
 Union des Aéroports Français 

Military aviation
 Direction de la Circulation Aérienne Militaire (DIRCAM)
  
 Map with locations of French Air Bases

Other
 
 
  - includes IATA codes
  - IATA and ICAO codes

Footnotes

External links

France
 
France